The Dutch famine of 1944–1945, also known as the Hunger Winter (from Dutch Hongerwinter), was a famine that took place in the German-occupied Netherlands, especially in the densely populated western provinces north of the great rivers, during the relatively harsh winter of 1944–1945, near the end of World War II.

A German blockade cut off food and fuel shipments from farm towns. Some 4.5 million were affected and survived thanks to soup kitchens. Loe de Jong (1914–2005), author of The Kingdom of the Netherlands During World War II, estimated at least 22,000 deaths occurred due to the famine. Another author estimated 18,000 deaths from the famine. Most of the victims were reportedly elderly men.

The famine was alleviated first by "Swedish bread" flour shipped in from Sweden to Dutch harbours, and subsequently by the airlift of food by the Royal Air Force, the Royal Canadian Air Force, and the United States Army Air Forces – after an agreement with the occupying Germans that if the Germans did not shoot at the mercy flights, the Allies would not bomb the German positions. These were Operations Manna and Chowhound. Operation Faust also trucked in food to the province.

Although these humanitarian missions mitigated the emergency, the famine persisted and it only ended with the liberation of the provinces by the Allies in May 1945.

Causes 

After D-Day in the summer of 1944, the Allied forces, to their own surprise swiftly advanced from Normandy and overran northern France and Belgium. In anticipation of a likewise imminent collapse of German defences in the Netherlands, the Dutch national railways complied with the exiled Dutch government's appeal for a nationwide railway strike starting in September 1944. This precisely coincided with the beginning of Operation Market Garden, the Allied forces' sharp thrust offensive deep into eastern Dutch territory that same month. The Allies were able to swiftly liberate southern portions of Dutch territory, but ceased their advance further into the Netherlands when Operation Market Garden failed in its attempt to seize a bridge across the Rhine at Arnhem after a German counter-offensive.

Meanwhile, after a public warning by the German administration's Reichskommissar Arthur Seyss-Inquart on September 24, that sabotage of the railways, telephone lines or post offices will be severely and collectively punished, the Nazi military command led by Wehrmachtbefehlshaber Friedrich Christiansen, began to implement the German retaliation by placing an embargo on all food transports to the western Netherlands. The food embargo started immediately as the military counter-offensive against Allied troops (Market Garden) was winding down on September 27. The embargo was partially lifted after three weeks, and fully lifted after six weeks in early November 1944, because the Germans feared chaos and disease might spread. 

This lifting of the blockade however didn't lead to food supply resuming and reaching pre-embargo levels. The drastic food scarcity that was ignited, continued to persist as a result of the increasingly harsh winter, increasing scarcity of other resources such as fuel, vehicles, the ongoing administrative and logistic inconveniences caused by the Germans, such as transport restrictions, shipment delays, and defensive flooding; as well as due to farmers and traders who had switched to supplying the black market during the embargo remaining in that parallel circuit. In the last two months of 1944 the officially distributed ration stock supply began to dwindle, first slowly, then drastically. The rations, which had been relatively stable up to around D-Day (June 1944), became progressively less and less worth in food value in the subsequent months, particularly in October and beyond.

The overall Allied advance into Germany was delayed by supply problems as the strategic port of Antwerp was not usable until the approaches had been secured and cleared in the Battle of the Scheldt. But Montgomery had given priority to "Market Garden"; and to the capture of the French Channel ports like Boulogne, Calais and Dunkirk, which were resolutely defended and had suffered demolitions by the retreating Germans. These developments led to Germans becoming more securely entrenched north of the major rivers in all of the Netherlands, which originally had been anticipated to fall into the hands of the Allies before the end of 1944.

Starvation 

In October, food shortages began to escalate everywhere in the still-occupied parts of the country. But particularly in the cities in the western Netherlands the stocks of various food items rapidly ran out in their entirety. The adult rations in cities such as Amsterdam dropped to below 1000 calories (4,200 kilojoules) a day by the end of November 1944 and to 580 calories in the west by the end of February 1945. Over this Hongerwinter ("Hunger winter"), a number of factors combined to cause starvation in especially the large cities in the West of the Netherlands. The winter in the month of January 1945 itself was unusually harsh, freezing rivers and canals and thereby prohibiting the important system of supply transport by boat for roughly a month between early January 1945 and early February 1945.

Also, the German army destroyed docks and bridges to flood the country and impede the Allied advance. This led to significant amount of land, particularly in the north and west, up to 250.000 hectare in total, to become flooded, further distorting supply routes and isolating regions from each other.

Thirdly, Allied bombing made it extremely difficult to transport food in bulk, since Allied bombers could not distinguish German military and civilian shipments. As the south-eastern (the Maas valley) and the south-western part of the Netherlands (Walcheren and Beveland) became one of the main western battlefields, these conditions combined to make the transport of existing food stocks in large enough quantities nearly impossible.

Malnutrition affected the entire still-unliberated areas, however starvation level was reached in the western subsection of the country, then home to 4.5 million people. Butter disappeared after October 1944, shortly after railway transport to the western parts of the Netherlands had stopped in September due to the railway strike. The supply of vegetable fats dwindled to a minuscule seven-month supply of 1.3 liters per person. At first 100 grams of cheese were allotted every two weeks; the meat coupons became worthless. The bread ration had already dropped from 2,200 to 1,800 and then to 1,400 grams per week. Then it fell to 1,000 grams in October, and by April 1945 to 400 grams a week. Together with one kilogram of potatoes, this then formed the entire weekly ration. The black market increasingly ran out of food as well, and with the gas and electricity and heat turned off, everyone was very cold and very hungry. In search of food, young strong people would walk for tens of kilometers to trade valuables for food at farms. Tulip bulbs and sugar beets were commonly consumed. Furniture and houses were dismantled to provide fuel for heating.

In the last months of 1944, in anticipation of the coming famine, tens of thousands of children were brought from the cities to rural areas where many remained until the end of the war. Deaths in the three big cities of the Western Netherlands (The Hague, Rotterdam, and Amsterdam) started in earnest in December 1944, reaching a peak in March 1945, but remained very high in April and May 1945. Malnutrition was rampant throughout all of the country. The famine was fully underway by January but the deadliest month would become March 1945.

Humanitarian intervention 

By the middle of that month, the mythical "Swedish bread" —actually Swedish Red Cross flour— which had originally arrived in January from Sweden (but the shipment had been stuck unloaded in the northern harbour of Delfzijl) began to reach a network of Dutch bakeries in cities, towns and villages, who used it to bake bread and ration it to the local population. For many this was the first proper bread (without diluted ingredients) they consumed in months. The following month, more humanitarian interventions took place, this time by airdrops. From 29 April to 7 May Operation Manna was conducted by the Royal Air Force and Royal Canadian Air Force. From 1 to 8 May, the U.S. Army Air Forces conducted Operation Chowhound. The Germans agreed not to shoot at the planes flying the mercy missions, and the Allies agreed not to bomb German positions. A third humanitarian assistance was domestically organized via a land-based, civilian supply chain from the east of the country. Called Operation Faust, food was trucked beginning on 2 May, first to the centrally located Rhenen before further distribution westwards.

End of the famine 

The Dutch Famine ended with the liberation by the Allies. Wehrmacht forces in the Netherlands surrendered on May 5, two days before Germany's overall surrender and official end of the war in Europe. Ongoing and new humanitarian assistances took place in the liberated country and the death rate quickly returned to normal figures by the early summer of 1945.

Legacy 

The Dutch famine of 1944–45 was a rare case of a famine which took place in a modern, developed, and literate country, albeit one suffering under the privations of occupation and war. The well-documented experience has helped scientists to measure the effects of famine on human health.

The Dutch Famine Birth Cohort Study found that the children of pregnant women exposed to famine were more susceptible to diabetes, obesity, cardiovascular disease, microalbuminuria and other health problems.

Grandchildren of pregnant women carrying female babies during the famine were also shown to be smaller as birth and suffer increased health issues later in life. This suggests damage or epigenetic changes to the eggs developing inside the female fetus in utero, a phenomenon known as intergenerational inheritance.

The discovery of the cause of coeliac disease may also be partly attributed to the Dutch famine. With wheat in very short supply there was an improvement at a children's ward of coeliac patients. Stories tell of the first precious supplies of bread being given specifically to the (no longer) sick children, prompting an immediate relapse. Thus in the 1940s the Dutch paediatrician Dr. Willem Dicke was able to corroborate his previously researched hypothesis that wheat intake was aggravating coeliac disease. Later Dicke went on to prove his theory.

Audrey Hepburn spent her childhood in the Netherlands (officially residing in Arnhem, then in Velp) during the famine and despite her later wealth she had lifelong negative medical repercussions. She had anemia, respiratory illnesses, and œdema as a result.

Subsequent academic research on the children who were affected in the second trimester of their mother's pregnancy found an increased incidence of schizophrenia in these children. Also increased among them were the rates of schizotypal personality and neurological defects.

See also 

 Effect of the Siege of Leningrad on the city
 Great famine of 1941–1942, in German-occupied Greece
 Historical trauma
 Holodomor in Ukraine
 Hunger Plan
 List of famines
 Överkalix study
 Prenatal nutrition and birth weight
 Siege of Leningrad
 Transgenerational epigenetics

References 

Notes

Bibliography

 Banning, C. (May 1946). "Food Shortage and Public Health, First Half of 1945". Annals of the American Academy of Political and Social Science. Vol. 245, The Netherlands during German Occupation, pp. 93–110. (JSTOR.)
 Barnouw, David (1999). De hongerwinter. .
 Bijvoet, Tom and Van Arragon Hutten, Anne (2013). The Hunger Winter. .
 Collingham, E. M. (2011). The Taste of War: World War Two and the Battle for Food.
 de Jong, Loe. The Kingdom of the Netherlands During World War II (vol VII), p. 1–270 (Verarmend Nederland, 1914–2005)
 Hart, Nicky. "Famine, Maternal Nutrition and Infant Mortality: A Re-Examination of the Dutch Hunger Winter", Population Studies Vol. 47, No. 1 (March 1993), pp. 27–46 (JSTOR)
 Hitchcock, William I. (2009). The Bitter Road to Freedom: The Human Cost of Allied Victory in World War II Europe. pp. 98–129.
 Sas, Anthony. "Holland's 'Hunger Winter' of 1944–45", Military Review, September 1983, Vol. 63, Issue 9, pp. 24–32.
 Sellin, Thorsten (ed.) (May 1946). "The Netherlands During German Occupation", Annals of the American Academy of Political and Social Science Vol. 245, pp. i to 180. (JSTOR.)
 Stein, Zena (ed.) (1975). Famine and human development: The Dutch hunger winter of 1944–1945.
 van der Zee, Henri A. (1998). The Hunger Winter: Occupied Holland 1944–1945. University of Nebraska Press.
 Warmbrunn, Werner (1963). The Dutch Under German Occupation 1940–1945. Stanford University Press.

External links 

 Dutch film (starting at minute 2:00)
 The Dutch Famine Birth Cohort Study
 Recipe for tulip-bulb puree at the Amsterdam City Archives
 The Hunger winter and the allied food relief that followed

Multimedia

 CBC Archives – CBC Radio (22 April 1945) reporting on the famine in Apeldoorn and the inflation of food prices.
 CBC Archives – CBC Radio (30 April 1945) reporting on the agreement to provide food to the Dutch.

1944 in the Netherlands
1945 in the Netherlands
1944 disasters in Europe
1945 disasters in Europe
Famines in Europe
Health disasters in the Netherlands
Military history of the Netherlands during World War II
20th-century famines
1944 disasters in the Netherlands
1945 disasters in the Netherlands